František Musil (born December 17, 1964), more commonly known in North America as Frank Musil, is a Czech former professional ice hockey player who spent several seasons in the National Hockey League (NHL) with the Minnesota North Stars, Calgary Flames, Ottawa Senators, and Edmonton Oilers. Musil is currently an amateur scout for the Sabres and assistant coach for the Czech national ice hockey team.

Playing career
Musil was selected in the second round of the 1983 NHL Entry Draft, 38th overall, by the Minnesota North Stars.  He played on 1985 Gold Medal winning IIHF Men's World Championships for Czechoslovakia. In addition to playing in various professional European leagues, Musil played 797 games in the NHL, for Minnesota as well as the Calgary Flames, Ottawa Senators and Edmonton Oilers.

Musil's draft position fell, but not because of talent, as there was some uncertainty whether he would be able to escape Czechoslovakia, then a Communist country.  Musil obtained a holiday visa and travelled to Yugoslavia with his girlfriend.  Leaving her at the resort, Musil met with Minnesota General Manager Lou Nanne and player agent Ritch Winter, who had arranged for an American work visa.  Winter and Nanne used the work visa to fool the border guards, who were unaware that Musil was a defecting hockey star.  Thus, in the summer of 1986, Musil arrived in Minnesota, and began his NHL career that fall.

Musil retired from hockey at the end of the 2000–01 season, and was hired by the Oilers as a scout.  Musil is married to former professional tennis player Andrea Holíková, who is the sister of former  NHL player Bobby Holík.

Musil's son, David, is a professional hockey player who has played in the NHL for Edmonton Oilers. His son Adam was selected by St. Louis Blues as the 94th pick of the 2015 NHL Entry Draft. His daughter, Dana, played volleyball for the University at Buffalo Bulls.

Awards
World Junior Championship medals- silver (1982, 1983), bronze (1984)
World Championship medals- silver (1983), gold (1985), and bronze (1992)

Career statistics

Regular season and playoffs

International

References

Further reading
Pioneer Press, June 23, 2011: Frantisek Musil has returned to the Twin Cities for another big moment

External links

Musil's Entry draft page

1964 births
Buffalo Sabres scouts
Calgary Flames players
Czech ice hockey defencemen
Detroit Vipers players
Edmonton Oilers players
Edmonton Oilers scouts
HC Dukla Jihlava players
HC Karlovy Vary players
HC Dynamo Pardubice players
HC Sparta Praha players
Indianapolis Ice players
Living people
Minnesota North Stars draft picks
Minnesota North Stars players
Ottawa Senators players
Sportspeople from Pardubice
Saschen Füchse players
Czechoslovak expatriate sportspeople in the United States
Czechoslovak expatriate sportspeople in Canada
Czechoslovak expatriate ice hockey people
Czech expatriate ice hockey players in Canada
Czech expatriate ice hockey players in the United States
Czech expatriate ice hockey players in Germany